The  Wilhelmina-ring is a bi-annual lifetime achievement award granted to a prominent Dutch sculptor. The price is initiated in 1998 by the Foundation Wilhelmina-ring to memorize that year Wilhelmina of the Netherlands was inaugurated as queen 100 years earlier.
 
By awarding the prize the Foundation Wilhelmina-ring want to encourage the interest in Dutch sculpture. The prize consists of a specially designed ring, an exhibition at the CODA art center in Apeldoorn, and a commission by the municipality of Apeldoorn to produce a sculpture, to be placed in the Sprengen Park.

Prize winners 
 1998 : Joop Beljon ; ring design: Lara Kassenaar ; sculpture  De versmelting (The fusion), unveiled on June 7, 2000.
 2000 : Joep van Lieshout ; ring design: Cees Post ; sculpture Apedoorn, unveiled on October 15, 2001.
 2002 : Jan van Munster ; ring design: Jan Matthesius; sculpture Ik (I), unveiled on November 13, 2003.
 2004 : Carel Visser : ring design: Ralph Bakker ; sculpture Meer (Lake), unveiled on April 26, 2006.
 2006: Maria Roosen ; ring design: Cees de Vries ; sculpture Boomsieraad (Tree Jewellery), unveiled on 3 December 2008.
 2009: John Körmeling ; ring design Dinie Besems ; sculpture The Origin of 1 Metre, unveiled on December 13, 2013.
 2011: Piet Slegers ; ring design Beate Klockmann ; sculpture Kringloop (Recycled), unveiled on June 28, 2013.
 2013: Hans van Houwelingen ; ring design Truike Verdegaal ; sculpture (data missing)
 2015: Auke de Vries ; ring design Lucy Sarneel
 2017: Eja Siepman van den Berg ; ring design Katja Prins
 2019: Tirzo Martha

In the years 2002 and 2004 also a prestigious prize was awarded.

See also

 List of European art awards

References

External links 
  Official Wilhelmina Foundation Prize website—

Dutch art awards
.
.
Contemporary art awards
Dutch contemporary art
Awards established in 1988
1988 establishments in the Netherlands